Dila may refer to:
 Dila District, Afghanistan, a District in Paktika Province, Afghanistan
 Dila, Afghanistan, a town in Dila District, Afghanistan
 Dila, Ethiopia
 Zaouia of Dila, a zaouia, founded in the 16th century by the Berbers of the Middle-Atlas, which came to rule the entire northern part of Morocco from 1640 until 1666
 Dila (barangay) in Calaca, Batangas
 A Dila is a spirit in Philippine mythology
 D-ILA is a type of display technology derived from LCOS
Dila, a barangay in Santa Rosa, Laguna